Júlio César Castro Espinosa (19 December 1951 – 17 June 2022), known as Júlio Espinosa, was a Brazilian football manager.

Honours
Sampaio Corrêa
Campeonato Maranhense: 1998

References

External links

1951 births
2022 deaths
Sportspeople from Porto Alegre
Brazilian football managers
Campeonato Brasileiro Série A managers
Campeonato Brasileiro Série B managers
Santos FC managers
Associação Atlética Internacional (Limeira) managers
Uberaba Sport Club managers
Esporte Clube Pelotas managers
Figueirense FC managers
Sociedade Esportiva e Recreativa Caxias do Sul managers
Ypiranga Futebol Clube managers
Sport Club Internacional managers
Comercial Futebol Clube (Ribeirão Preto) managers
Associação Chapecoense de Futebol managers
Sampaio Corrêa Futebol Clube managers
Sociedade Esportiva do Gama managers
América Futebol Clube (RN) managers
Clube Náutico Capibaribe managers
Ceará Sporting Club managers
Sport Club do Recife managers
Clube do Remo managers
Avaí FC managers
Moto Club de São Luís managers
Rio Branco Esporte Clube managers
Ríver Atlético Clube managers
Central Sport Club managers
Clube de Regatas Brasil managers
Centro Sportivo Alagoano managers
Qatar national football team managers
Brazilian expatriate football managers
Brazilian expatriate sportspeople in Qatar
Brazilian expatriate sportspeople in Japan
Expatriate football managers in Qatar
Expatriate football managers in Japan